The chestnut-faced babbler (Zosterornis whiteheadi) is a species of bird in the white-eye family Zosteropidae. It is endemic to the island of Luzon in the Philippines. There are two subspecies, Z. w. whiteheadi in northern and central Luzon, and Z. w. sorsogonensis in southeastern Luzon. The species is generally found in mountain forests, generally above 1000 m (although occasionally down to 100m). Within its range it is catholic in its choice of habitat, frequenting broadleaf forests, moist mossy forests, pine forest, open forest, scrub and human modified habitat as well.

The chestnut-faced babbler is a medium-sized babbler, 15 cm in length and weighing between 17–28 g. The plumage of this species is not sexually dimorphic, and that of juveniles has not been described. They have a chestnut face with a grey crown and nape, and an incomplete white eye ring. The wings and tail are olive-brown and the flanks paler olive, tending towards buff-yellow on the breast. The subspecies Z. w. sorsogonensis is similar, but the crown and nape are edged in black. The call is described as rapid, busy and metallic.

The species feeds on seeds, fruit, insects (particularly beetles) and spiders. Single birds, pairs or flocks of up to thirty will feed, usually in the lower growth of the forest, but occasionally up to the canopy. They will join mixed-species feeding flocks with other species. Water is obtained from pitcher plants.

References

Collar, N. J. & Robson, C. 2007. Family Timaliidae (Babblers)  Pp. 70 – 291 in; del Hoyo, J., Elliott, A. & Christie, D.A. eds. Handbook of the Birds of the World, Vol. 12. Picathartes to Tits and Chickadees. Lynx Edicions, Barcelona.

chestnut-faced babbler
Birds of Luzon
chestnut-faced babbler
chestnut-faced babbler
Taxonomy articles created by Polbot